Hico is a census-designated place (CDP) in Fayette County, West Virginia, United States. Hico has a post office with ZIP code 25854. As of the 2010 census, its population was 272.

Some say the community was named after a variety of tobacco called hico, while others believe the name is a transfer from Hyco, Virginia (an extinct town).

Climate
The climate in this area is characterized by hot, humid summers and generally mild to cool winters.  According to the Köppen Climate Classification system, Hico has a humid subtropical climate, abbreviated "Cfa" on climate maps.

References

Census-designated places in Fayette County, West Virginia
Census-designated places in West Virginia